Viktoria Däschlein-Gessner (born 1982) is a German chemist who is the Chair of Inorganic Chemistry II at Ruhr University Bochum. Her research considers organometallic chemistry and catalysis. She has developed ylidic ligands to stabilise reactive main group compounds.

Early life and education 
Gessner was born in Würzburg. Her high school teacher told her not to study chemistry as it was "not for women,". In 2002, she began undergraduate studies in chemistry at the Philipps University of Marburg, but after a few years moved to the University of Würzburg. She moved to Technical University of Dortmund for doctoral research, working in the laboratory of Carsten Strohmann on organolithium reagents. She was a postdoctoral researcher at the University of California, Berkeley, where she worked alongside Don Tilley. She eventually returned to the Julius Maximilian University in Würzburg, where she worked with Holger Braunschweig.

Research and career 
In 2012, Gessner founded her own research group, supported by the German Research Foundation Emmy Noether program. In 2016, she was appointed Professor at the Ruhr University Bochum. Her research considered the development of ligan systems with novel bonding properties.

Gessner has studied Ylide chemistry. She developed YPhos ligands, which can offer high versatility in catalysis systems. These ligands have a negatively charged carbon atom next to a phosphorus, making the ligands uniquely rich in electrons. In coupling chemistry (e.g. C–C and C–H), monoligated palladium YPhos complexes can improve activity, and gold catalysis with YPhos ligands can drive hydroamination reactions.

Awards and honours 
 2008 DSM South Science and Technology Award
 2008 European Young Chemists Award Silver Medal
 2009 DSM North Science and Technology Award
 2009 Dissertation Award of TU Dortmund
 2010 IUPAC Prize for Young Researchers in Chemistry 
 2011 Alexander von Humboldt Foundation Feodor Lynen Return Scholarship
 2012 Helene Lange Prize
 2012 Emmy Noether Scholarship
 2013 Dr. Otto-Röhm Memorial Foundation Prize
 2014 Exploration scholarship of the Boehringer-Ingelheim Foundation
 2014 X-ray award for young scientists at the University of Würzburg
 2015 ADUC Award for Habilitants
 2016 Thieme Journal Award
 2016 European Research Council Starting Grant
 2020 Organometallics Distinguished Author Award
 2022 Klung Wilhelmy Science Award 2022

Selected publications

References 

1982 births
21st-century German chemists
People from Würzburg
University of Marburg alumni
University of Würzburg alumni
Technical University of Dortmund alumni
Academic staff of Ruhr University Bochum
German women chemists
21st-century German women scientists
Living people